Plagiomnium insigne, the badge moss or coastal leafy moss, is a species of moss found on humus in moist, shaded, lowland forests. It can also be found on soil along trails and other shaded, open areas. The moss sometimes forms lush, extensive mats.

Description
They have wide-spreading, glistening leaves when moist that become shrivelled and dull when dry. The fertile plants are unisexual. The male plants can be distinguished by their conspicuously flattened heads. The sterile stems are arched, like those of strawberries.

Badge moss is the largest mnium. It can be distinguished from magnificent moss by its unisexual plants, leaf edges that extend down the stems for a noticeable length, and 3-6 stalked capsules per plant.

References

Mniaceae